Parliamentary elections were held in Portugal on 3 November 1957. The ruling National Union won all 120 seats.

Electoral system
The elections were held using 21 multi-member constituencies and one single-member constituency covering the Azores, together electing a total of 120 members, 13 of which were from Portuguese colonies.

Voters could delete names from the lists of candidates, but could not replace them. Suffrage was given to all men aged 21 or over as long as they were literate or paid over 100 escudos in taxation, and to women aged over 21 if they had completed secondary education, or if they were the head of a household and met the same literacy and tax criteria as men.

Campaign
Although the majority of the opposition to the Estado Novo regime boycotted the election in protest at the lack of a free vote, a total of 34 opposition candidates attempted to register for the elections, 12 in Lisbon, 10 in Oporto, six in Aveiro and six in Braga. The Lisbon candidates were rejected as their application was a day late, whilst the Oporto and Aveiro candidates withdrew after failing to receive a guarantee that they could observe vote counting. Only the six candidates in Braga ultimately contested the election.

Results

References

See also
Politics of Portugal
List of political parties in Portugal
Elections in Portugal

Legislative elections in Portugal
Portugal
1957 elections in Portugal
November 1957 events in Europe